The 2017 CONMEBOL Copa América de Futsal was the 12th edition of the Copa América de Futsal, the international futsal championship under FIFA rules organised by CONMEBOL for the men's national teams of South America. The tournament was held in San Juan, Argentina between 5–12 April 2017.

Teams
All ten CONMEBOL member national teams entered the tournament.

Venues
All matches are played in one venue: Estadio Aldo Cantoni in San Juan.

Draw
The draw of the tournament was held on 30 March 2017, 14:30 ART (UTC−3), at the Sports Secretariat of the city of San Juan. The ten teams were drawn into two groups of five teams. The hosts and defending champions Argentina and the defending runners-up Paraguay were seeded into Groups A and B respectively, while the remaining teams were placed into four "pairing pots" according to their results in the 2015 Copa América de Futsal: Brazil–Colombia, Chile–Uruguay, Venezuela–Peru, Ecuador–Bolivia.

Squads
Each team had to submit a squad of 14 players, including a minimum of two goalkeepers (Regulations Article 4.1).

Match officials
A total of 16 referees were appointed for the tournament.

Group stage
The top two teams of each group advance to the semi-finals, while the teams in third, fourth and fifth advance to the fifth place, seventh place, and ninth place play-offs respectively. The teams are ranked according to points (3 points for a win, 1 point for a draw, 0 points for a loss). If tied on points, tiebreakers are applied in the following order (Regulations Article 6.2):
Results in head-to-head matches between tied teams (points, goal difference, goals scored);
Goal difference in all matches;
Goals scored in all matches;
Drawing of lots.

All times are local, ART (UTC−3).

Group A

Group B

Knockout stage
In the semi-finals and final, extra time and penalty shoot-out are used to decide the winner if necessary.

Bracket

Ninth place play-off

Seventh place play-off

Fifth place play-off

Semi-finals

Third place play-off

Final

Final ranking

References

External links
Copa América Futsal Argentina 2017, CONMEBOL.com
CONMEBOL Copa América Futsal 2017 San Juan Argentina, Government of San Juan

2017
2017 in South American futsal
2017 in Argentine football
April 2017 sports events in South America
2017 Copa America Futsal